Nurbergen Batyrgalitovich Zhumagaziyev  (born 29 November 1990 in Oral, Kazakhstan) is a Kazakh male short track speed skater.

Biography 
At the Asian Games in Alma-Ata, he competed in the individual races for 1,000 and 1,500 meters, as well as in the relay for 5,000 meters. In the relay, the team won bronze, at a distance of 1,000 meters came seventh. The fall of an athlete from Mongolia, which led to the fall of Nurbergen, prevented him from making it to the final of performances at 1,500 meters.

At the Olympic Games in Sochi, he competed in the individual 500-meter race and in the 5,000-meter relay. The personal result at 500 meters is 42.680 seconds and 29th place, in the relay together with the team showed a result of 6:54.630, which brought them 5th place.

Coaching career 
July 16, 2022 — appointed head coach of the Kazakhstan short track team.

References

External links
 Nurbergen Zhumagaziyev's profile, from http://www.sochi2014.com; retrieved 2014-04-21.
 

1990 births
Living people
Kazakhstani male short track speed skaters
Olympic short track speed skaters of Kazakhstan
Short track speed skaters at the 2014 Winter Olympics
Short track speed skaters at the 2018 Winter Olympics
Asian Games medalists in short track speed skating
Asian Games bronze medalists for Kazakhstan
Short track speed skaters at the 2007 Asian Winter Games
Short track speed skaters at the 2011 Asian Winter Games
Medalists at the 2011 Asian Winter Games
Universiade medalists in short track speed skating
Universiade bronze medalists for Kazakhstan
Competitors at the 2017 Winter Universiade
People from Oral, Kazakhstan
21st-century Kazakhstani people